Shvets (alternate spellings Shwets, Schwets, Švets, Švec, Svec, Shwec, Chvets) is a Ukrainian (Швець Shvets) and Czech (Švec, Shvets) occupational surname literally meaning "cobbler" or "shoemaker".

The surname may refer to:
 Anton Shvets (born 1993), Ukrainian-born Russian footballer
 Fedir Shvets (1882–1940), Ukrainian geologist, public activist and statesman
 Oksana Shvets (1955—2022), Ukrainian actress
 Yana Shvets (born 1989), Ukrainian singer
 Yuri Pavlovich Shvets (1902–1972), Soviet cinematic artist
 Yuri Shvets (born 1952), KGB Major
 Mark Švets (born 1976), Estonian international footballer
 Jiří Švec (1935—2014), Czech wrestler
 Otakar Švec (1892—1955), Czech sculptor

See also
 
 Shevchenko
 Shevchuk

Ukrainian-language surnames
Surnames of Ukrainian origin
Occupational surnames